Events in the year 2023 in Kuwait.

Incumbents

Deaths 
 26 February – Ali Al-Baghli (aged 75), politician

References

 

 
2020s in Kuwait
Years of the 21st century in Kuwait
Kuwait
Kuwait